Tostkar is a genus of ground beetles in the family Carabidae. There are about five described species in Tostkar, found in Nepal.

Species
These five species belong to the genus Tostkar:
 Tostkar daoulivek Morvan, 1998
 Tostkar deuvei Morvan, 1998
 Tostkar kumatai (Habu, 1973)
 Tostkar nepalensis Morvan, 1998
 Tostkar tev Morvan, 1998

References

Platyninae